"La Fama" (stylized in all caps) is a song recorded by Spanish singer-songwriter Rosalía featuring Canadian singer the Weeknd. It was released on 11 November 2021 through Columbia Records, as the lead single from her third studio album Motomami (2022). The song was written and produced by both performers alongside El Guincho, Frank Dukes, Noah Goldstein, Sir Dylan, Sky Rompiendo and Tainy.

"La Fama" is a mid-tempo non-guitar driven bachata track with electropop and experimental elements. Its lyrics see Rosalía describing the seductions of fame as well as its superficiality and emptiness. The song was met with generally positive reviews from music critics, who embraced its challenging way to produce bachata without its characteristic acoustic guitar. It received a nomination for Record of the Year at the 23rd Annual Latin Grammy Awards. The song's music video, directed by Director X and inspired by Robert Rodríguez' From Dusk till Dawn, accompanied the song's release, and depicts Rosalía as a bloodstone vedette.

Commercially, "La Fama" debuted atop the PROMUSICAE chart in Spain, becoming Rosalía's seventh number-one single in her home country and the Weeknd's first. Elsewhere, the song entered the top ten charts in Belgium, France, Mexico, Bulgaria, Panama, El Salvador and the US Hot Latin Songs. It also entered the Billboard Hot 100 and the Global 200, peaking at 94 and 34 respectively.

Background
On 2 November 2021, to celebrate the three-year anniversary of the release of her second studio album El Mal Querer (2018), Rosalía revealed that her upcoming third studio album Motomami would be released in 2022. Earlier in October, during a meet and greet in Mexico, Rosalía revealed that the lead single from Motomami would be released in November. Later in the month, she posted a snippet of a then-unreleased song on her TikTok account.

On 8 November 2021, multiple advertisements were spotted in Buenos Aires that revealed the name of the single was "La Fama". It was also announced that the song would feature the Weeknd and that it was set to be released on 11 November. Later in the day, Rosalía unveiled the trailer for the song's music video. This marked the second collaboration between Rosalía and the Weeknd, following the remix of the Weeknd's 2019 single "Blinding Lights".

Composition
"La Fama" is a mid-tempo bachata track with electropop influences. In a statement for Rolling Stone, Rosalía noted that she "wanted to write, in my own way, a bachata with a little story around ambition. The challenge was also to compose a bachata song without using a guitar, which was able by chopping my voice. Taking as a reference the lyrics of Rubén Blades or Patti Smith and the songs of Aventura, I ended up writing a story of romance with fame." She also stated for Zane Lowe on Apple Music 1 that, after expressing her aim to write a bachata track, Romeo Santos reached out to the singer and sent her an extense playlist. The composition of "La Fama" began in 2018 and was intended to be solo. However, the Weeknd hopped on the song in early 2020, before the recording of the "Blinding Lights" remix.

Music video
The music video for "La Fama", directed by Director X, who also directed the music video for Rosalía and J Balvin's "Con Altura", premiered on 11 November 2021 alongside the single's release. The video featured a cameo appearance from actor Danny Trejo and is heavily inspired by the 1996 horror cult film From Dusk till Dawn. The typography featured in the video was inspired by the 1996 slasher film Scream.

In the video, Rosalía, introduced by Trejo, performs at a dimly lit nightclub as "La Fama". She wanders out to the crowd until she notices the Weeknd sitting alone watching her performance. She seduces him onto the stage, where they embrace before Rosalía stabs him with a hidden knife. She continues her performance while the Weeknd perishes. The audience applauds enthusiastically as Trejo is heard off-screen saying "Be careful what you wish for".

Accolades

Personnel 
Credits adapted from the liner notes of Motomami.

Publishing

 Published by Songs of Universal, Inc. O/b/O itself and La Guantera Publishing (BMI) / KMR Music Royalties, admin. by Kobalt Songs Music Publishing (ASCAP) / Noah Goldstein Music (ASCAP) / EMI April Music Inc. (ASCAP) O/b/O itself EMI Music Publishing Ltd. and Nylan King Music Ltd. (PRS) / Sony/ATV Discos Music Publishing LLC (ASCAP) / EMI Blackwood Music Inc. (BMI) / WC Music Cop. (ASCAP) O/b/O Warner/Chappell Music Spain S.A. and RICO Publishing / Sony/ATV Ballad (BMI)
 Recorded by David Rodríguez, Tyler Murphy and Shin Kamiyama.
 Mixed by Manny Marroquín at Larrabee Studio, West Hollywood, California.
 Mastered by Chris Gehringer at Sterling Sound, Edgewater, New Jersey.

Production personnel

 Rosalía Vila – production, lyrics, composition, vocal production; vocals, vocal arrangement.
 The Weeknd – production, composition; vocals
 Dylan Patrice – production, composition, vocal production; vocal arrangement, bass, synthesizer
 Noah Goldstein – production, composition, vocal production; vocal arrangement
 Frank Dukes – production, composition; synthesizer, vocal arrangement
 El Guincho – production, composition; drums, synthesizer
 Roland García – additional production; drums, percussion
 Tainy – production; bass
 Sky Rompiendo – production
 Caroline Shaw – vocal arrangement
 Jean Rodríguez – vocal production
 LA Session Singers: choir, background vocals

Technical personnel

 Manny Marroquin – mixing
 Zach Peraya – assistant mix engineer
 Jeremie Inhaber – assistant mix engineer
 Anthony Vilchis – assistant mix engineer
 Chris Gehringer – mastering

Charts

Weekly charts

Year-end charts

Certifications

Release history

See also
List of Billboard Hot Latin Songs and Latin Airplay number ones of 2022

References

External links
 

2021 singles
2021 songs
Rosalía songs
The Weeknd songs
Columbia Records singles
Number-one singles in Spain
Spanish-language songs
Bachata songs
Music videos directed by Director X
Songs written by Rosalía
Songs written by the Weeknd
Songs written by Frank Dukes
Songs written by Tainy
Songs written by el Guincho
Song recordings produced by the Weeknd
Song recordings produced by Frank Dukes
Song recordings produced by Tainy